The 2014 Duck Commander 500 was a NASCAR Sprint Cup Series stock car race held on April 7, 2014, at Texas Motor Speedway in Fort Worth, Texas. Contested over 340 laps – extended from 334 laps, due to a green–white–checker finish – on the  quad-oval, it was the seventh race of the 2014 NASCAR Sprint Cup Series. Joey Logano of Team Penske won the race, while Jeff Gordon finished second and Kyle Busch, Brian Vickers, and the best placed rookie Kyle Larson rounded out the top five. After Larson, the top rookies of the race were Austin Dillon in 21st, and Justin Allgaier in 24th place.

Previous week's race
Kurt Busch took the lead with ten laps to go and held off Jimmie Johnson to end an 83-race winless streak drought, and score his 25th career victory in the STP 500 at Martinsville Speedway. Busch stated that he "didn't know if we'd be able to do it, you know? The 48 car is king here, him or the 24", and that he had "been on this journey for a while and every time you come to Martinsville, you just kind of draw a line through it like there's no way I'll be able to challenge those Hendrick guys or be up in the top 10. This Stewart-Haas team gave me a car to do it." Johnson, who led 296 laps, stated that his car was "so on edge slipping and sliding" and that a "lack of security in our own car kept us from feeling more racy and putting a bumper to someone or really getting inside someone aggressively".

Report

Background
The track's turns are banked at twenty-four degrees, while the front stretch, the location of the finish line, is five degrees. The back stretch, opposite of the front, also has a five degree banking. The racetrack has a permanent capacity of 138,122 spectators, and an infield capacity of 53,000. The defending champion from 2013 was Kyle Busch.

Entry list
The entry list for the Duck Commander 500 was released on Tuesday, April 1 at 10:16 a.m. Eastern time. Forty-six cars were included on the initial list. J. J. Yeley, who wasn't running for points in the Sprint Cup Series, was a post cutoff entry (13 days prior to the race) and wouldn't have received owners points had he made the race which he didn't.

Practice

First practice
During first practice, Kurt Busch cut his left-rear tire and went nose first into the wall in turn 3. This necessitated rolling out his backup car along with David Ragan who went spinning through the infield and destroyed the nose of his car. Because these changes took place before qualifying, neither had to start from the rear.

Final practice

Qualifying

Stewart stated that his entire team had "been doing an awesome job", and this his pole position was "the first time I've been able to do something impressive for the team, so I'm excited about that". Brad Keselowski joined Stewart on the front row, expressing that he had "put down a great lap" and that he "didn't see that coming". Four drivers failed to qualify, with Ryan Truex, David Stremme, J. J. Yeley, and Joe Nemechek not making the field.

Qualifying results

Race

The race was scheduled to start at 3:16 p.m. Eastern time, but was delayed by rain. NASCAR subsequently moved the race to Monday, with an expected start time of 12:00 p.m. Eastern time.

The race began under caution at 12:11 p.m. with Tony Stewart leading the field. These were the first laps he led all season. During the caution period, one of the jet dryers on the backstretch caused the hood pins of Brad Keselowski's car to come off, knocking up the hood and subsequently forcing him and Ryan Newman to pit to fix it. Just like a real jet engine, the jet dryers that are used to dry the race track blow hot air at very high pressure. Even though the race was already underway, he and Newman were allowed to retake their original spots in the running order. Clint Bowyer and Kyle Busch also pitted to check out the hoods of their cars.

After ten laps of caution to start the race, the green flag waived with Stewart leading the way. Only two laps later, the second caution of the race flew after points leader Dale Earnhardt Jr. cut through the grass in the tri-oval which was very wet from two days of downpours. The car went straight into the wall hard on fire and came to a stop on the apron in turn 2. “I was following the 43 (Aric Almirola) and just didn’t see the grass,’’ Earnhardt said. “That’s the thing with these cars is you can’t really see good at that angle, so I didn’t have a good visual where the grass was. Just a mistake on my part. I didn’t know I was that close to the grass. I’m disappointed. I don’t like it when I made the mistake there. That’s going to bother me for a while.’’ Jimmie Johnson, who was riding behind his teammate, sustained heavy damage to his nose and caved in the windshield. These cars have a Lexan glass behind the glass windshield to protect the driver.

The race restarted on lap 25. Kevin Harvick led a lap before handing the lead back to his teammate (and owner), but for the fifth straight race, his car had a mechanical failure (engine failure) on lap 29 that took him out of the race.

The third caution of the race flew on lap 49 (competition caution). Reed Sorenson stayed out to lead a lap under the caution before making his stop.

The race restarted on lap 54 with Tony Stewart leading the way.

On lap 71, Stewart became the all-time leader in laps led at Texas Motor Speedway.

Brad Keselowski took the lead on lap 77.

Keselowski surrendered the lead to make his pit stop on lap 97 and handed the lead to Jeff Gordon.

Gordon made his stop on lap 99 and the lead cycled back to Brad.

Denny Hamlin took the lead on lap 122.

Hamlin gave up the lead to pit on lap 141 and Jeff Gordon retook the lead. Denny had to serve a drive-through penalty for speeding on pit road.

Gordon pitted on lap 143 and handed the lead to Kyle Busch. He didn't stay in front for long as Jeff passed him for the lead on lap 153.

The fourth caution of the race flew on lap 176 after Kurt Busch went sliding through the grass on the front stretch trying to slow down to hit pit road.

The race restarted on lap 184. Brad Keselowski edged out Jeff Gordon at the line to take the lead.

The fifth caution of the race flew on lap 219 after Kurt Busch cut down his left-rear tire and spun out in turn 1.

The race restarted on lap 227 and Joey Logano took the lead from his teammate.

Debris on the front stretch brought out the sixth caution with 80 laps to go.

The race restarted with 74 laps to go.

Logano hit pit road with 35 laps to go and handed the lead to Denny Hamlin.

Hamlin ducked onto pit road the next lap and handed the lead to Clint Bowyer.

Bowyer gave up the lead the next lap to pit and Joey Logano cycled back to the lead.

A third cut down left-rear tire from Kurt Busch's car brought out the seventh caution of the race with two laps to go. Jeff Gordon exited pit road as the leader by taking just two right-side tires. Brad Keselowski exited fourth, but was forced to serve a drive-through penalty for speeding on pit road. He would end up finishing 15th.

The race restarted with two laps to go (past its scheduled distance).

Joey Logano passed Jeff Gordon on the final lap to score the victory. "Talk about a lot of emotion," Logano said. "You feel like you are about to win the race and then the caution comes out when you come to take the white and you’re like, ‘You’ve got to be kidding me.'" “That was a great battle,” said Gordon. “At one point I thought we had a shot at it. We got a pretty good restart. Joey was right on me and I was pretty loose in one and two, and I wish I had gone a little bit higher in three and four. But, he got that run off of four and he got in the back of me, and I thought I was going to wreck, so at that point I was like second would be good."

Race results

Race statistics
 Lead changes: 18 among nine drivers
 Cautions/Laps: 7 for 49         
 Red flags: 0 
 Time of race: 3 hours, 48 minutes, and 2 seconds
 Average speed:

Media

Television

Radio

Standings after the race

Drivers' Championship standings

Manufacturers' Championship standings

Note: Only the first sixteen positions are included for the driver standings.

References

Duck Commander 500
Duck Commander 500
Duck Commander 500
2010s in Fort Worth, Texas
NASCAR races at Texas Motor Speedway